Par Eshkaft (also Romanized as  Perāshkaft and Per Eshkaft; also known as Per Eshkafī) is a village in Qarah Chaman Rural District, Arzhan District, Shiraz County, Fars Province, Iran. At the 2006 census, its population was 77, in 22 families.

References 

Populated places in Shiraz County